The 'Knights of Ali' (Arabic: فتيان علي | Fityan Ali), also known as the 'Youth of Ali', were a small Shia political movement and militia that used to operate at West Beirut, being a member of the Lebanese National Movement (LNM) during the 1975–77 phase of the Lebanese Civil War.

History
The group was first established in 1967 by Salaheddine Khalil at the southern Lebanese port city of Tyre, but was temporarily disbanded in 1973. That same year, Khalil was replaced by Ahmad Safwan who reestablished the movement, which operated mainly in the Shia-majority neighborhood of Naba'a in Beirut.

Lebanese Civil War, 1975–1976
When the civil war began in April 1975, the movement, now based in Naba'a, transformed itself into a 400-strong militia to counter the right-wing Christian Lebanese Front militias, and took part in the fighting at Sin el Fil and Sad el-Bauchrieh.

According to journalist Robert Fisk, some Christians allegedly accused the 'Knights of Ali' of the Black Thursday massacre, where more than 50 Christians were massacred in retaliation for the murder of a palestinian man in West Beirut and mutilated, whose severed genitalia were placed in their mouths and whose bodies were dumped in a Muslim cemetery at the mainly Muslim Beirut district of Bashoura, close to the Green Line separating East and West Beirut. The 'Knights of Ali' claimed to stand for the Shi'ite Movement of the Deprived which was headed by Imam Musa al-Sadr, but he was quick to dissociate his Movement from this atrocity. 

The Fityan Ali became void after the fall of Naba'a on 6 August 1976, and was disbanded later that year by Ahmad Safwan after being subjected to an assassination attempt by the Druze Progressive Socialist Party (PSP) Popular Liberation Forces (PLF) militia.

See also 
Black Thursday (Lebanon)
Lebanese National Movement
Lebanese Civil War
Lebanese Front
List of weapons of the Lebanese Civil War
War of the Camps

Notes

References
Kamal Suleiman Salibi, Crossroads to Civil War: Lebanon 1958-1976, Caravan Books Inc., New York 2005 (3rd edition). 
Michael Johnson, All honourable men: the social origins of war in Lebanon, Centre for Lebanese Studies, Oxford and London, Oxford University and I.B. Tauris, 2001. , 1860647154
 

Israeli–Lebanese conflict
Lebanese National Movement
Factions in the Lebanese Civil War